Ibeyi is a French musical duo consisting of twin sisters Lisa-Kaindé Diaz and Naomi Diaz. The duo sings in English, French, Spanish and Yoruba, In Yoruba, Ibeyi (Ìbejì) means "twins".

Their music has elements of Yoruba, French and Afro-Cuban, and fuses jazz with beats, samples with traditional instruments., Lisa, the lead singer, plays the piano; Naomi plays the traditional Peruvian/Cuban percussion instruments cajón and Batá drum.

Early life and career 

The fraternal twins (born 13 December 1994, in Paris) lived in Havana for the first two years of their lives, then moved to Paris, where they were educated. They visited Cuba yearly on holiday, but were primarily raised in Paris, where they currently reside.

Their father was the famed Cuban percussionist Anga Díaz, who has received a Grammy award for his work with the Latin jazz band Irakere, and was also a member of Buena Vista Social Club ensemble, playing with Ibrahim Ferrer, Rubén González and Máximo Francisco Repilado Muñoz aka Compay Segundo. On his death in 2006, Naomi, then aged 11, learned to play his signature instrument, the cajón. Together the sisters studied Yoruba folk songs. Their mother is French-Venezuelan singer Maya Dagnino, who serves as their manager and encouraged Lisa-Kainde's songwriting.

In 2013, they signed to the record label, XL Recordings. Label owner Richard Russell is the only other contributor to their self-titled debut album, released in 2015. Released when they were 20, the album pays tribute to their deceased father and the track Yanira immortalizes the duo's older sister, who died in 2013. The song ends with a synth that sounds like a life-support monitor.

In 2014, they received attention for the video for their album's second single, "River". The twins appear in a closeup shot throughout, taking turns having their heads forced underwater while the other sings.

In 2016, the twins appeared in the short film for Beyoncé's album Lemonade as members of Beyonce's farm utopia that offers a safe space for black women. In May 2016, Ibeyi returned to Havana for live performances at the CHANEL 2016 Cruise collection in Cuba and the international music festival MUSICABANA.

Their 2017 album Ash was nominated for IMPALA's European Album of the Year Award.

Influences 
As well as their father Anga Díaz, the duo claims Frank Ocean, James Blake, and King Krule among their influences. In live shows, they have covered rapper Jay Electronica's Better in Tune with the Infinite and others.

Their recordings also show a strong and spiritual connection to their Yoruba roots, as do the name and themes. They also pay tribute to Santería, a syncretism practiced by many Afro-Cubans, and many cubans in general.

Discography

Albums

EPs

Singles

Notes

References

External links 

 
 XLRecordings – Ibeyi page
 UK Talent Agency Profile
 French Talent Agency Profile

Cuban electronic music groups
French electronic music groups
Cuban contemporary R&B musical groups
French contemporary R&B musical groups
Cuban soul musical groups
French soul musical groups
French musical duos
Yoruba-language singers
English-language singers from France
Cuban twins
French twins
Cuban people of Yoruba descent
Cuban emigrants to France
French people of Cuban descent
French people of Yoruba descent
21st-century French musicians
Yoruba women musicians
21st-century French women musicians
Twin musical duos
Female musical duos
French women in electronic music
Cuban musical duos